Oreovo is a village in the Bitola Municipality of Macedonia

Demographics
According to the 2002 census, the village had a total of 23 inhabitants. Ethnic groups in the village include:

Macedonians 23

References

External links
 Visit Macedonia

Villages in Bitola Municipality